Nihilism is a philosophy, or family of views within philosophy, that rejects generally accepted or fundamental aspects of human existence, such as objective truth, knowledge, morality, values, or meaning. The term was popularized by Ivan Turgenev, and more specifically by his character Bazarov in the novel Fathers and Sons. 

There have been different nihilist positions, including that human values are baseless, that life is meaningless, that knowledge is impossible, or that some set of entities do not exist or are meaningless or pointless.

Scholars of nihilism may regard it as merely a label that has been applied to various separate philosophies, or as a distinct historical concept arising out of nominalism, skepticism, and philosophical pessimism, as well as possibly out of Christianity itself. Contemporary understanding of the idea stems largely from the Nietzschean 'crisis of nihilism', from which derive the two central concepts: the destruction of higher values and the opposition to the affirmation of life. Earlier forms of nihilism, however, may be more selective in negating specific hegemonies of social, moral, political and aesthetic thought.

The term is sometimes used in association with anomie to explain the general mood of despair at a perceived pointlessness of existence or arbitrariness of human principles and social institutions. Nihilism has also been described as conspicuous in or constitutive of certain historical periods. For example, Jean Baudrillard and others have characterized postmodernity as a nihilistic epoch or mode of thought. Likewise, some theologians and religious figures have stated that postmodernity and many aspects of modernity represent nihilism by a negation of religious principles. Nihilism has, however, been widely ascribed to both religious and irreligious viewpoints.

In popular use, the term commonly refers to forms of existential nihilism, according to which life is without intrinsic value, meaning, or purpose. Other prominent positions within nihilism include the rejection of all normative and ethical views, the rejection of all social and political institutions, the stance that no knowledge can or does exist, and a number of metaphysical positions, which assert that non-abstract objects do not exist, that composite objects do not exist, or even that life itself does not exist.

Etymology, terminology and definition 

The etymological origin of nihilism is the Latin root word , meaning 'nothing', which is similarly found in the related terms annihilate, meaning 'to bring to nothing', and nihility, meaning 'nothingness'. The term nihilism emerged in several places in Europe during the 18th century, notably in the German form , though was also in use during the Middle Ages to denote certain forms of heresy. The concept itself first took shape within Russian and German philosophy, which respectively represented the two major currents of discourse on nihilism prior to the 20th century. The term likely entered English from either the German , Late Latin , or French .

Early examples of the term's use are found in German publications. In 1733, German writer Friedrich Leberecht Goetz used it as a literary term in combination with noism. In the period surrounding the French Revolution, the term was also a pejorative for certain value-destructive trends of modernity, namely the negation of Christianity and European tradition in general. Nihilism first entered philosophical study within a discourse surrounding Kantian and post-Kantian philosophies, notably appearing in the writings of Swiss esotericist Jacob Hermann Obereit in 1787 and German philosopher Friedrich Heinrich Jacobi in 1799. As early as 1824, the term began to take on a social connotation with German journalist Joseph von Görres attributing it to a negation of existing social and political institutions. In Russian journalism the word continued to have significant social connotations.

From the time of Jacobi, the term almost fell completely out of use throughout Europe until it was revived by Russian author Ivan Turgenev, who brought the word into popular use with his 1862 novel Fathers and Sons, leading many scholars to believe he coined the term. The nihilist characters of the novel define themselves as those who "deny ", who do "not take any principle on faith, whatever reverence that principle may be enshrined in", and who regard "at the present time, negation is the most useful of all". Despite Turgenev's own anti-nihilistic leanings, many of his readers likewise took up the name of nihilist, thus ascribing the Russian nihilist movement its name. Nihilism was further discussed by German philosopher Friedrich Nietzsche, who used the term to describe the Western world's disintegration of traditional morality. For Nietzsche, nihilism applied to both the modern trends of value-destruction expressed in the 'death of God', as well as what he saw as the life-denying morality of Christianity. Under Nietzsche's profound influence, the term was then further treated within French philosophy and continental philosophy more broadly, while the influence of nihilism in Russia arguably continued well into the Soviet era.

Religious scholars such as Altizer have stated that nihilism must necessarily be understood in relation to religion, and that the study of core elements of its character requires fundamentally theological consideration.

History

Buddhism 
The concept of nihilism was discussed by the Buddha (563 B.C. to 483 B.C.), as recorded in the Theravada and Mahayana Tripiṭaka. The Tripiṭaka, originally written in Pali, refers to nihilism as natthikavāda and the nihilist view as micchādiṭṭhi. Various sutras within it describe a multiplicity of views held by different sects of ascetics while the Buddha was alive, some of which were viewed by him to be morally nihilistic. In the "Doctrine of Nihilism" in the Apannaka Sutta, the Buddha describes moral nihilists as holding the following views:

 Giving produces no beneficial results;
 Good and bad actions produce no results;
 After death, beings are not reborn into the present world or into another world;
 There is no one in the world who, through direct knowledge, can confirm that beings are reborn into this world or into another world.

The Buddha further states that those who hold these views will fail to see the virtue in good mental, verbal, and bodily conduct and the corresponding dangers in misconduct, and will therefore tend towards the latter.

Nirvana and nihilism 
The culmination of the path that the Buddha taught was nirvana, "a place of nothingness…nonpossession and…non-attachment…[which is] the total end of death and decay." Ajahn Amaro, an ordained Buddhist monk of more than 40 years, observes that in English nothingness can sound like nihilism. However, the word could be emphasized in a different way, so that it becomes no-thingness, indicating that nirvana is not a thing you can find, but rather a state where you experience the reality of non-grasping.

In the Alagaddupama Sutta, the Buddha describes how some individuals feared his teaching because they believe that their self would be destroyed if they followed it. He describes this as an anxiety caused by the false belief in an unchanging, everlasting self. All things are subject to change and taking any impermanent phenomena to be a self causes suffering. Nonetheless, his critics called him a nihilist who teaches the annihilation and extermination of an existing being. The Buddha's response was that he only teaches the cessation of suffering. When an individual has given up craving and the conceit of 'I am' their mind is liberated, they no longer come into any state of 'being' and are no longer born again.

The Aggi-Vacchagotta Sutta records a conversation between the Buddha and an individual named Vaccha that further elaborates on this. In the sutta, Vaccha asks the Buddha to confirm one of the following, with respect to the existence of the Buddha after death:

 After death a Buddha reappears somewhere else;
 After death a Buddha does not reappear;
 After death a Buddha both does and does not reappear;
 After death a Buddha neither does nor does not reappear.

To all four questions, the Buddha answers that the terms "reappears somewhere else," "does not reappear," "both does and does not reappear," and "neither does nor does not reappear," do not apply. When Vaccha expresses puzzlement, the Buddha asks Vaccha a counter question to the effect of: if a fire were to go out and someone were to ask you whether the fire went north, south, east or west, how would you reply? Vaccha replies that the question does not apply and that an extinguished fire can only be classified as 'out'.

Ṭhānissaro Bhikkhu elaborates on the classification problem around the words 'reappear,' etc. with respect to the Buddha and Nirvana by stating that a "Person who has attained the goal [nirvana] is thus indescribable because [they have] abandoned all things by which [they] could be described." The Suttas themselves describe the liberated mind as 'untraceable' or as 'consciousness without feature', making no distinction between the mind of a liberated being that is alive and the mind of one that is no longer alive.

Despite the Buddha's explanations to the contrary, Buddhist practitioners may, at times, still approach Buddhism in a nihilistic manner. Ajahn Amaro illustrates this by retelling the story of a Buddhist monk, Ajahn Sumedho, who in his early years took a nihilistic approach to Nirvana. A distinct feature of Nirvana in Buddhism is that an individual attaining it is no longer subject to rebirth. Ajahn Sumedho, during a conversation with his teacher Ajahn Chah, comments that he is "Determined above all things to fully realize Nirvana in this lifetime…deeply weary of the human condition and…[is] determined not to be born again." To this, Ajahn Chah replies: "What about the rest of us, Sumedho? Don't you care about those who'll be left behind?" Ajahn Amaro comments that Ajahn Chah could detect that his student had a nihilistic aversion to life rather than true detachment.

Jacobi 

The term nihilism was first introduced to philosophy by Friedrich Heinrich Jacobi (1743–1819), who used the term to characterize rationalism, and in particular the Spinoza's determinism and the Aufklärung, in order to carry out a reductio ad absurdum according to which all rationalism (philosophy as criticism) reduces to nihilism—and thus it should be avoided and replaced with a return to some type of faith and revelation. Bret W. Davis writes, for example:The first philosophical development of the idea of nihilism is generally ascribed to Friedrich Jacobi, who in a famous letter criticized Fichte's idealism as falling into nihilism. According to Jacobi, Fichte's absolutization of the ego (the 'absolute I' that posits the 'not-I') is an inflation of subjectivity that denies the absolute transcendence of God. A related but oppositional concept is fideism, which sees reason as hostile and inferior to faith.

Kierkegaard 

Søren Kierkegaard (1813–1855) posited an early form of nihilism, which he referred to as leveling. He saw leveling as the process of suppressing individuality to a point where an individual's uniqueness becomes non-existent and nothing meaningful in one's existence can be affirmed:

Kierkegaard, an advocate of a philosophy of life, generally argued against levelling and its nihilistic consequences, although he believed it would be "genuinely educative to live in the age of levelling [because] people will be forced to face the judgement of [levelling] alone." George Cotkin asserts Kierkegaard was against "the standardization and levelling of belief, both spiritual and political, in the nineteenth century," and that Kierkegaard "opposed tendencies in mass culture to reduce the individual to a cipher of conformity and deference to the dominant opinion." In his day, tabloids (like the Danish magazine Corsaren) and apostate Christianity were instruments of levelling and contributed to the "reflective apathetic age" of 19th-century Europe. Kierkegaard argues that individuals who can overcome the levelling process are stronger for it, and that it represents a step in the right direction towards "becoming a true self." As we must overcome levelling, Hubert Dreyfus and Jane Rubin argue that Kierkegaard's interest, "in an increasingly nihilistic age, is in how we can recover the sense that our lives are meaningful."

Russian nihilism 

Russian nihilism centered on the dissolution of existing values and ideals, incorporating theories of hard determinism, atheism, materialism, positivism, and rational egoism, while rejecting metaphysics, sentimentalism, and aestheticism. Leading philosophers of this school of thought included Nikolay Chernyshevsky and Dmitry Pisarev.

The intellectual origins of the Russian nihilist movement can be traced back to 1855 and perhaps earlier, where it was principally a philosophy of extreme moral and epistemological skepticism. However, it was not until 1862 that the name nihilism was first popularized, when Ivan Turgenev used the term in his celebrated novel Fathers and Sons to describe the disillusionment of the younger generation towards both the progressives and traditionalists that came before them, as well as its manifestation in the view that negation and value-destruction were most necessary to the present conditions. The movement very soon adopted the name, despite the novel's initial harsh reception among both the conservatives and younger generation.

Though philosophically both nihilistic and skeptical, Russian nihilism did not unilaterally negate ethics and knowledge as may be assumed, nor did it espouse meaninglessness unequivocally. Even so, contemporary scholarship has challenged the equating of Russian nihilism with mere skepticism, instead identifying it as a fundamentally  movement. As passionate advocates of negation, the nihilists sought to liberate the Promethean might of the Russian people which they saw embodied in a class of prototypal individuals, or new types in their own words. These individuals, according to Pisarev, in freeing themselves from all authority become exempt from moral authority as well, and are distinguished above the rabble or common masses.

Later interpretations of nihilism were heavily influenced by works of anti-nihilistic literature, such as those of Fyodor Dostoevsky, which arose in response to Russian nihilism. "In contrast to the corrupted nihilists [of the real world], who tried to numb their nihilistic sensitivity and forget themselves through self-indulgence, Dostoevsky's figures voluntarily leap into nihilism and try to be themselves within its boundaries.", writes contemporary scholar Nishitani. They search for and experiment with ways for the self to justify itself after God has disappeared."

Nietzsche 

Nihilism is often associated with the German philosopher Friedrich Nietzsche, who provided a detailed diagnosis of nihilism as a widespread phenomenon of Western culture. Though the notion appears frequently throughout Nietzsche's work, he uses the term in a variety of ways, with different meanings and connotations.

With regard to Nietzsche's development of thought, it has been noted in research that although he dealt with "nihilistic" themes from 1869 onwards ("pessimism, with nirvana and with nothingness and non-being"), a conceptual use of nihilism occurred for the first time in handwritten notes in the middle of 1880 (KSA 9.127-128). This was the time of a then popular scientific work that reconstructed the so-called "Russian nihilism" on the basis of Russian newspaper reports on nihilistic incidents (N. Karlowitsch: Die Entwicklung des Nihilismus. Berlin 1880). This collection of material, published in three editions, was not only known to a broad German readership, but its influence on Nietzsche can also be proven.

Karen L. Carr describes Nietzsche's characterization of nihilism as "a condition of tension, as a disproportion between what we want to value (or need) and how the world appears to operate." When we find out that the world does not possess the objective value or meaning that we want it to have or have long since believed it to have, we find ourselves in a crisis. Nietzsche asserts that with the decline of Christianity and the rise of physiological decadence, nihilism is in fact characteristic of the modern age, though he implies that the rise of nihilism is still incomplete and that it has yet to be overcome. Though the problem of nihilism becomes especially explicit in Nietzsche's notebooks (published posthumously), it is mentioned repeatedly in his published works and is closely connected to many of the problems mentioned there.

Nietzsche characterized nihilism as emptying the world and especially human existence of meaning, purpose, comprehensible truth, or essential value. This observation stems in part from Nietzsche's perspectivism, or his notion that "knowledge" is always by someone of some thing: it is always bound by perspective, and it is never mere fact. Rather, there are interpretations through which we understand the world and give it meaning. Interpreting is something we can not go without; in fact, it is a condition of subjectivity. One way of interpreting the world is through morality, as one of the fundamental ways that people make sense of the world, especially in regard to their own thoughts and actions. Nietzsche distinguishes a morality that is strong or healthy, meaning that the person in question is aware that he constructs it himself, from weak morality, where the interpretation is projected on to something external.

Nietzsche discusses Christianity, one of the major topics in his work, at length in the context of the problem of nihilism in his notebooks, in a chapter entitled "European Nihilism." Here he states that the Christian moral doctrine provides people with intrinsic value, belief in God (which justifies the evil in the world) and a basis for objective knowledge. In this sense, in constructing a world where objective knowledge is possible, Christianity is an antidote against a primal form of nihilism, against the despair of meaninglessness. However, it is exactly the element of truthfulness in Christian doctrine that is its undoing: in its drive towards truth, Christianity eventually finds itself to be a construct, which leads to its own dissolution. It is therefore that Nietzsche states that we have outgrown Christianity "not because we lived too far from it, rather because we lived too close." As such, the self-dissolution of Christianity constitutes yet another form of nihilism. Because Christianity was an interpretation that posited itself as the interpretation, Nietzsche states that this dissolution leads beyond skepticism to a distrust of all meaning.

Stanley Rosen identifies Nietzsche's concept of nihilism with a situation of meaninglessness, in which "everything is permitted." According to him, the loss of higher metaphysical values that exist in contrast to the base reality of the world, or merely human ideas, gives rise to the idea that all human ideas are therefore valueless. Rejecting idealism thus results in nihilism, because only similarly transcendent ideals live up to the previous standards that the nihilist still implicitly holds. The inability for Christianity to serve as a source of valuating the world is reflected in Nietzsche's famous aphorism of the madman in The Gay Science. The death of God, in particular the statement that "we killed him", is similar to the self-dissolution of Christian doctrine: due to the advances of the sciences, which for Nietzsche show that man is the product of evolution, that Earth has no special place among the stars and that history is not progressive, the Christian notion of God can no longer serve as a basis for a morality.

One such reaction to the loss of meaning is what Nietzsche calls passive nihilism, which he recognizes in the pessimistic philosophy of Schopenhauer. Schopenhauer's doctrine, which Nietzsche also refers to as Western Buddhism, advocates separating oneself from will and desires in order to reduce suffering. Nietzsche characterizes this attitude as a "will to nothingness", whereby life turns away from itself, as there is nothing of value to be found in the world. This mowing away of all value in the world is characteristic of the nihilist, although in this, the nihilist appears inconsistent: this "will to nothingness" is still a form of valuation or willing. He describes this as "an inconsistency on the part of the nihilists":

Nietzsche's relation to the problem of nihilism is a complex one. He approaches the problem of nihilism as deeply personal, stating that this predicament of the modern world is a problem that has "become conscious" in him. According to Nietzsche, it is only when nihilism is overcome that a culture can have a true foundation upon which to thrive. He wished to hasten its coming only so that he could also hasten its ultimate departure.

He states that there is at least the possibility of another type of nihilist in the wake of Christianity's self-dissolution, one that does not stop after the destruction of all value and meaning and succumb to the following nothingness. This alternate, 'active' nihilism on the other hand destroys to level the field for constructing something new. This form of nihilism is characterized by Nietzsche as "a sign of strength," a willful destruction of the old values to wipe the slate clean and lay down one's own beliefs and interpretations, contrary to the passive nihilism that resigns itself with the decomposition of the old values. This willful destruction of values and the overcoming of the condition of nihilism by the constructing of new meaning, this active nihilism, could be related to what Nietzsche elsewhere calls a free spirit or the Übermensch from Thus Spoke Zarathustra and The Antichrist, the model of the strong individual who posits his own values and lives his life as if it were his own work of art. It may be questioned, though, whether "active nihilism" is indeed the correct term for this stance, and some question whether Nietzsche takes the problems nihilism poses seriously enough.

Heideggerian interpretation of Nietzsche 
Martin Heidegger's interpretation of Nietzsche influenced many postmodern thinkers who investigated the problem of nihilism as put forward by Nietzsche. Only recently has Heidegger's influence on Nietzschean nihilism research faded. As early as the 1930s, Heidegger was giving lectures on Nietzsche's thought. Given the importance of Nietzsche's contribution to the topic of nihilism, Heidegger's influential interpretation of Nietzsche is important for the historical development of the term nihilism.

Heidegger's method of researching and teaching Nietzsche is explicitly his own. He does not specifically try to present Nietzsche as Nietzsche. He rather tries to incorporate Nietzsche's thoughts into his own philosophical system of Being, Time and Dasein. In his Nihilism as Determined by the History of Being (1944–46), Heidegger tries to understand Nietzsche's nihilism as trying to achieve a victory through the devaluation of the, until then, highest values. The principle of this devaluation is, according to Heidegger, the will to power. The will to power is also the principle of every earlier valuation of values. How does this devaluation occur and why is this nihilistic? One of Heidegger's main critiques on philosophy is that philosophy, and more specifically metaphysics, has forgotten to discriminate between investigating the notion of a being (seiende) and Being (Sein). According to Heidegger, the history of Western thought can be seen as the history of metaphysics. Moreover, because metaphysics has forgotten to ask about the notion of Being (what Heidegger calls Seinsvergessenheit), it is a history about the destruction of Being. That is why Heidegger calls metaphysics nihilistic. This makes Nietzsche's metaphysics not a victory over nihilism, but a perfection of it.

Heidegger, in his interpretation of Nietzsche, has been inspired by Ernst Jünger. Many references to Jünger can be found in Heidegger's lectures on Nietzsche. For example, in a letter to the rector of Freiburg University of November 4, 1945, Heidegger, inspired by Jünger, tries to explain the notion of "God is dead" as the "reality of the Will to Power." Heidegger also praises Jünger for defending Nietzsche against a too biological or anthropological reading during the Nazi era.

Heidegger's interpretation of Nietzsche influenced a number of important postmodernist thinkers. Gianni Vattimo points at a back-and-forth movement in European thought, between Nietzsche and Heidegger. During the 1960s, a Nietzschean 'renaissance' began, culminating in the work of Mazzino Montinari and Giorgio Colli. They began work on a new and complete edition of Nietzsche's collected works, making Nietzsche more accessible for scholarly research. Vattimo explains that with this new edition of Colli and Montinari, a critical reception of Heidegger's interpretation of Nietzsche began to take shape. Like other contemporary French and Italian philosophers, Vattimo does not want, or only partially wants, to rely on Heidegger for understanding Nietzsche. On the other hand, Vattimo judges Heidegger's intentions authentic enough to keep pursuing them. Philosophers who Vattimo exemplifies as a part of this back and forth movement are French philosophers Deleuze, Foucault and Derrida. Italian philosophers of this same movement are Cacciari, Severino and himself. Jürgen Habermas, Jean-François Lyotard and Richard Rorty are also philosophers who are influenced by Heidegger's interpretation of Nietzsche.

Deleuzean interpretation of Nietzsche 
Gilles Deleuze's interpretation of Nietzsche's concept of nihilism is different - in some sense diametrically opposed - to the usual definition (as outlined in the rest of this article). Nihilism is one of the main topics of Deleuze's early book Nietzsche and Philosophy (1962). There, Deleuze repeatedly interprets Nietzsche's nihilism as "the enterprise of denying life and depreciating existence". Nihilism thus defined is therefore not the denial of higher values, or the denial of meaning, but rather the depreciation of life in the name of such higher values or meaning. Deleuze therefore (with, he claims, Nietzsche) says that Christianity and Platonism, and with them the whole of metaphysics, are intrinsically Nihilist.

Postmodernism 
Postmodern and poststructuralist thought has questioned the very grounds on which Western cultures have based their 'truths': absolute knowledge and meaning, a 'decentralization' of authorship, the accumulation of positive knowledge, historical progress, and certain ideals and practices of humanism and the Enlightenment.

Derrida 
Jacques Derrida, whose deconstruction is perhaps most commonly labeled nihilistic, did not himself make the nihilistic move that others have claimed. Derridean deconstructionists argue that this approach rather frees texts, individuals or organizations from a restrictive truth, and that deconstruction opens up the possibility of other ways of being. Gayatri Chakravorty Spivak, for example, uses deconstruction to create an ethics of opening up Western scholarship to the voice of the subaltern and to philosophies outside of the canon of western texts. Derrida himself built a philosophy based upon a 'responsibility to the other'. Deconstruction can thus be seen not as a denial of truth, but as a denial of our ability to know truth. That is to say, it makes an epistemological claim, compared to nihilism's ontological claim.

Lyotard 
Lyotard argues that, rather than relying on an objective truth or method to prove their claims, philosophers legitimize their truths by reference to a story about the world that can't be separated from the age and system the stories belong to—referred to by Lyotard as meta-narratives. He then goes on to define the postmodern condition as characterized by a rejection both of these meta-narratives and of the process of legitimation by meta-narratives. This concept of the instability of truth and meaning leads in the direction of nihilism, though Lyotard stops short of embracing the latter.

In lieu of meta-narratives we have created new language-games in order to legitimize our claims which rely on changing relationships and mutable truths, none of which is privileged over the other to speak to ultimate truth.

Baudrillard 
Postmodern theorist Jean Baudrillard wrote briefly of nihilism from the postmodern viewpoint in Simulacra and Simulation. He stuck mainly to topics of interpretations of the real world over the simulations of which the real world is composed. The uses of meaning were an important subject in Baudrillard's discussion of nihilism:

Positions 
From the 20th century, nihilism has encompassed a range of positions within various fields of philosophy. Each of these, as the Encyclopædia Britannica states, "denied the existence of genuine moral truths or values, rejected the possibility of knowledge or communication, and asserted the ultimate meaninglessness or purposelessness of life or of the universe."
 Cosmic nihilism is the position that reality or the cosmos is either wholly or significantly unintelligible and that it provides no foundation for human aims and principles. Particularly, it may regard the cosmos as distinctly hostile or indifferent to humanity. It is often related to both epistemological and existential nihilism, as well as cosmicism.
 Epistemological nihilism is a form of philosophical skepticism according to which knowledge does not exist, or, if it does exist, it is unattainable for human beings. It should not be confused with epistemological fallibilism, according to which all knowledge is uncertain.
 Existential nihilism is the position that life has no intrinsic meaning or value. With respect to the universe, existential nihilism posits that a single human or even the entire human species is insignificant, without purpose, and unlikely to change in the totality of existence. The meaninglessness of life is largely explored in the philosophical school of existentialism, where one can create their own subjective meaning or purpose. In popular use, "nihilism" now most commonly refers to forms of existential nihilism.
 Metaphysical nihilism is the position that concrete objects and physical constructs might not exist in the possible world, or that, even if there exist possible worlds that contain some concrete objects, there is at least one that contains only abstract objects. 
 Extreme metaphysical nihilism, also sometimes called ontological nihilism, is the position that nothing actually exists at all. The American Heritage Medical Dictionary defines one form of nihilism as "An extreme form of skepticism that denies all existence." A similar skepticism concerning the concrete world can be found in solipsism. However, despite the fact that both views deny the certainty of objects' true existence, the nihilist would deny the existence of self, whereas the solipsist would affirm it. Both of these positions are considered forms of anti-realism.
 Mereological nihilism, also called compositional nihilism, is the metaphysical position that objects with proper parts do not exist. This position applies to objects in space, and also to objects existing in time, which are posited to have no temporal parts. Rather, only basic building blocks without parts exist, and thus the world we see and experience, full of objects with parts, is a product of human misperception (i.e., if we could see clearly, we would not perceive compositive objects). This interpretation of existence must be based on resolution: The resolution with which humans see and perceive the "improper parts" of the world is not an objective fact of reality, but is rather an implicit trait that can only be qualitatively explored and expressed. Therefore, there is no arguable way to surmise or measure the validity of mereological nihilism. For example, an ant can get lost on a large cylindrical object because the circumference of the object is so large with respect to the ant that the ant effectively feels as though the object has no curvature. Thus, the resolution with which the ant views the world it exists "within" is an important determining factor in how the ant experiences this "within the world" feeling.
 Moral nihilism, also called ethical nihilism, is the meta-ethical position that no morality or ethics exists whatsoever; therefore, no action is ever morally preferable to any other. Moral nihilism is distinct from both moral relativism and expressivism in that it does not acknowledge socially constructed values as personal or cultural moralities. It may also differ from other moral positions within nihilism that, rather than argue there is no morality, hold that if it does exist, it is a human construction and thus artificial, wherein any and all meaning is relative for different possible outcomes. An alternative scholarly perspective is that moral nihilism is a morality in itself. Cooper writes, "In the widest sense of the word 'morality', moral nihilism is a morality."
 Passive and active nihilism, the former of which is also equated to philosophical pessimism, refer to two approaches to nihilist thought; passive nihilism sees nihility as an end in itself, whereas active nihilism attempts to surpass it. For Nietzsche, passive nihilism further encapsulates the "will to nothing" and the modern condition of resignation or unawareness towards the dissolution of higher values brought about by the 19th century.
 Political nihilism is the position holding no political goals whatsoever, except for the complete destruction of all existing political institutions—along with the principles, values, and social institutions that uphold them. Though often related to anarchism, it may differ in that it presents no method of social organisation after a negation of the current political structure has taken place. An analysis of political nihilism is further presented by Leo Strauss.
 Therapeutic nihilism, also called medical nihilism, is the position that the effectiveness of medical intervention is dubious or without merit. Dealing with the philosophy of science as it relates to the contextualized demarcation of medical research, Jacob Stegenga applies Bayes' theorem to medical research and argues for the premise that "Even when presented with evidence for a hypothesis regarding the effectiveness of a medical intervention, we ought to have low confidence in that hypothesis."

In culture, the arts, and media

Dada 
The term Dada was first used by Richard Huelsenbeck and Tristan Tzara in 1916. The movement, which lasted from approximately 1916 to 1923, arose during World War I, an event that influenced the artists. The Dada Movement began in the old town of Zürich, Switzerland—known as the "Niederdorf" or "Niederdörfli"—in the Café Voltaire. The Dadaists claimed that Dada was not an art movement, but an anti-art movement, sometimes using found objects in a manner similar to found poetry.

This tendency toward devaluation of art has led many to claim that Dada was an essentially nihilistic movement. Given that Dada created its own means for interpreting its products, it is difficult to classify alongside most other contemporary art expressions. Due to perceived ambiguity, it has been classified as a nihilistic modus vivendi.

Literature 
The term "nihilism" was actually popularized in 1862 by Ivan Turgenev in his novel Fathers and Sons, whose hero, Bazarov, was a nihilist and recruited several followers to the philosophy. He found his nihilistic ways challenged upon falling in love.

Anton Chekhov portrayed nihilism when writing Three Sisters. The phrase "what does it matter" or variants of this are often spoken by several characters in response to events; the significance of some of these events suggests a subscription to nihilism by said characters as a type of coping strategy.

The philosophical ideas of the French author, the Marquis de Sade, are often noted as early examples of nihilistic principles.

Media 
The frequently self-destructive and amoral tendencies of a nihilistic worldview can be seen in many of today's mediums, including movies and TV shows. 

Rick Sanchez from Rick and Morty is portrayed as a high-functioning alcoholic burdened with knowledge. In his self-proclaimed genius, he adapts an existential nihilistic understanding that there is little to no reason to live.

Patrick Bateman in Bret Easton Ellis's 1991 novel American Psycho and 2000 film adaptation, displays both moral and existential nihilism. Throughout the film, Bateman does not shy away from murder or torture to accomplish his goals. As he realizes the evil in his deeds he tries to confess and take on the punishment for his acts of crime.

Phil Connors in the 1993 comedy film Groundhog Day, develops existential nihilistic tendencies near the middle of the film. As he lives the same day an unspoken countless number of times he slips into a depression and attempts to commit suicide in a variety of different ways. He will also resort to kidnapping Punxsutawney Phil, the groundhog to which he credits his looping days, and drives off a cliff, killing both of them.

Vincent, the main antagonist of the 2004 film Collateral believes that life has no meaning because that human nature is intrinsically evil, and that deep down, people care only about themselves.

In the 2022 film Everything Everywhere All at Once, the lead antagonist, Jobu Tupaki, comes to an existential nihilistic conclusion that the infinite chaos of the multiverse means that there is no reason to continue to exist.  She manifests her nihilism by creating a black hole-like "everything bagel" in which she will destroy herself and the rest of the multiverse.  Her mother Evelyn is briefly persuaded by her logic but then refutes it in favor of a more positive outlook based on the value of human relationships and choice.

See also

Citations

General and cited sources

Primary texts 
 Brassier, Ray (2007) Nihil Unbound: Enlightenment and Extinction, New York: Palgrave Macmillan.
 Jacobi, Friedrich Heinrich, Jacobi an Fichte (1799/1816), German Text (1799/1816), Appendix with Jacobi's and Fichte's complementary Texts, critical Apparatus, Commentary, and Italian Translation, Istituto Italiano per gli Studi Filosofici, Naples 2011, .
 Heidegger, Martin (1982), Nietzsche, Vols. I-IV, trans. F.A. Capuzzi, San Francisco: Harper & Row.
 Kierkegaard, Søren (1998/1854), The Moment and Late Writings: Kierkegaard's Writings, Vol. 23, ed. and trans. Howard V. Hong and Edna H. Hong, Princeton, N.J: Princeton University Press. .
 Kierkegaard, Søren (1978/1846), The Two Ages : Kierkegaard's Writings, Vol 14, ed. and trans. Howard V. Hong, and Edna H. Hong, Princeton, N.J: Princeton University Press. .
 Kierkegaard, Søren (1995/1850), Works of Love : Kierkegaard's Writings, Vol 16, ed. and trans. Howard V. Hong and Edna H. Hong, Princeton, N.J: Princeton University Press. .
 Nietzsche, Friedrich (2005/1886), Beyond Good and Evil, trans. Helen Zimmern.
 Nietzsche, Friedrich (1974/1887), The Gay Science, trans. Walter Kaufman, Vintage, .
 Nietzsche, Friedrich (1980), Sämtliche Werken. Kritische Studienausgabe, ed. C. Colli and M. Montinari, Walter de Gruyter. .
 Nietzsche, Friedrich (2008/1885), Thus Spake Zarathustra, trans. Thomas Common.
 Tartaglia, James (2016), Philosophy in a Meaningless Life: A System of Nihilism, Consciousness and Reality, London: Bloomsbury Publishing.

Secondary texts 
 Arena, Leonardo Vittorio (1997), Del nonsense: tra Oriente e Occidente, Urbino: Quattroventi.
 Arena, Leonardo Vittorio (2012), Nonsense as the Meaning, ebook.
 Arena, Leonardo Vittorio (2015), On Nudity. An Introduction to Nonsense, Mimesis International.
 Barnett, Christopher (2011), Kierkegaard, pietism and holiness, Ashgate Publishing.
 Carr, Karen (1992), The Banalisation of Nihilism, State University of New York Press.
 Cattarini, L. S. (2018), Beyond Sartre and Sterility: Surviving Existentialism (Montreal: contact argobookshop.ca)
 Cunningham, Conor (2002), Genealogy of Nihilism: Philosophies of Nothing & the Difference of Theology, New York, NY: Routledge.
 Dent, G., Wallace, M., & Dia Center for the Arts. (1992). "Black popular culture" (Discussions in contemporary culture ; no. 8). Seattle: Bay Press.
 Dod, Elmar (2013), Der unheimlichste Gast. Die Philosophie des Nihilismus. Marburg: Tectum 2013.
 Dreyfus, Hubert L. (2004), Kierkegaard on the Internet: Anonymity vs. Commitment in the Present Age. Retrieved at December 1, 2009.
 Fraser, John (2001), "Nihilism, Modernisn and Value", retrieved at December 2, 2009.
 Galimberti, Umberto (2008), L'ospite inquietante. Il nichilismo e i giovani, Milano: Feltrinelli. . 
 Gillespie, Michael Allen (1996), Nihilism Before Nietzsche, Chicago, IL: University of Chicago Press.
 Giovanni, George di (2008), "Friedrich Heinrich Jacobi", The Stanford Encyclopedia of Philosophy, Edward N. Zalta (ed.). Retrieved on December 1, 2009.
 Harper, Douglas, "Nihilism", in: Online Etymology Dictionary, retrieved at December 2, 2009.
 Harries, Karsten (2010), Between nihilism and faith: a commentary on Either/or, Walter de Gruyter Press.
 Hibbs, Thomas S. (2000), Shows About Nothing: Nihilism in Popular Culture from The Exorcist to Seinfeld, Dallas, TX: Spence Publishing Company.
 Kopić, Mario (2001), S Nietzscheom o Europi, Zagreb: Jesenski i Turk.
 Korab-Karpowicz, W. J. (2005), "Martin Heidegger (1889—1976)", in: Internet Encyclopedia of Philosophy, retrieved at December 2, 2009.
 Kuhn, Elisabeth (1992), Friedrich Nietzsches Philosophie des europäischen Nihilismus, Walter de Gruyter.
 Irti, Natalino (2004), Nichilismo giuridico, Laterza, Roma-Bari.
 Löwith, Karl (1995), Martin Heidegger and European Nihilism, New York, NY: Columbia UP.
 Marmysz, John (2003), Laughing at Nothing: Humor as a Response to Nihilism, Albany, NY: SUNY Press.
 Müller-Lauter, Wolfgang (2000), Heidegger und Nietzsche. Nietzsche-Interpretationen III, Berlin-New York.
 Parvez Manzoor, S. (2003), "Modernity and Nihilism. Secular History and Loss of Meaning", retrieved at December 2, 2009.
 Rose, Eugene Fr. Seraphim (1995), Nihilism, The Root of the Revolution of the Modern Age, Forestville, CA: Fr. Seraphim Rose Foundation.
 Rosen, Stanley (2000), Nihilism: A Philosophical Essay, South Bend, Indiana: St. Augustine's Press (2nd Edition).
 Severino, Emanuele (1982), Essenza del nichilismo, Milano: Adelphi. .
 Slocombe, Will (2006), Nihilism and the Sublime Postmodern: The (Hi)Story of a Difficult Relationship, New York, NY: Routledge.
 Tigani, Francesco (2010), Rappresentare Medea. Dal mito al nichilismo, Roma: Aracne. . 
 Tigani, Francesco (2014), Lo spettro del nulla e il corpo del nichilismo, in La nave di Teseo. Saggi sull'Essere, il mito e il potere, Napoli: Guida. . 
 Villet, Charles (2009), Towards Ethical Nihilism: The Possibility of Nietzschean Hope, Saarbrücken: Verlag Dr. Müller.
 Williams, Peter S. (2005), I Wish I Could Believe in Meaning: A Response to Nihilism, Damaris Publishing.

External links 

 Nihil - center for nihilism and nihilist studies
 Nihilist Abyss 
 Friedrich Nietzsche, Thus Spake Zarathustra, translated by Thomas Common
 "Nihilism"  in the Internet Encyclopedia of Philosophy
 Fathers and Sons by Ivan Turgenev
 "Moral Skepticism", section "Skeptical Hypotheses" in the Stanford Encyclopedia of Philosophy
 
 "In the Dust of This Planet", Radiolab podcast on nihilism and popular culture
 "Nihilism", In Our Time, BBC Radio 4 discussion with Rob Hopkins, Raymond Tallis and Catherine Belsey (Nov. 16, 2000)

 
Philosophy of life
Political ideologies